Moon Knight is a Marvel Comics superhero.

Moon Knight may also refer to:

 Moon Knight (TV series), a 2022 Disney+ miniseries
 Moon Knight (Marvel Cinematic Universe), one of the characters of the Marvel Cinematic Universe